The following is a list of French Open champions in tennis:

Champions
† Not considered to be a Grand Slam event. A French club members only tournament.

†† Disputed champions: Not considered to be a Grand Slam event. Not sanctioned or recognised by the FFT. See Tournoi de France

Senior

Wheelchair

Junior

‡ = a player who won both the junior and senior title.† = a player who won the junior title and reached the senior final.

See also
Lists of champions of specific events
List of French Open men's singles champions
List of French Open women's singles champions
List of French Open men's doubles champions
List of French Open women's doubles champions
List of French Open mixed doubles champions

Other Grand Slam tournament champions
List of Australian Open champions
List of Wimbledon champions
List of US Open champions

Notes

References